is passenger railway station located in the city of Sanuki, Kagawa Prefecture, Japan. It is operated by JR Shikoku and has the station number "T15".

Lines
The station is served by the JR Shikoku Kōtoku Line and is located 27.7 km from the beginning of the line at Takamatsu.

Layout
Sanuki-Tsuda Station consists of a side platform and an island platform serving three tracks. The station building is unstaffed and serves only as a waiting room. Access to the island platform is by means of a footbridge. There is a siding which branches off track 1 and ends in a vehicle shed near the station building.

History
At that time the station was operated by Japanese Government Railways, later becoming Japanese National Railways (JNR). With the privatization of JNR on 1 April 1987, control of the station passed to JR Shikoku.

Surrounding area
Kagawa Prefecture Okawa Joint Government Building
Kagawa Prefectural Tosan Agricultural Improvement and Extension Center
Sanuki Municipal Tsuda Children's Center
Sanuki Municipal Tsuda Elementary School

See also
List of railway stations in Japan

References

External links

Station timetable

Railway stations in Kagawa Prefecture
Railway stations in Japan opened in 1926
Sanuki, Kagawa